Saveliy Moiseyevich Zeydenberg (28 April 1862 – 1942) was a Russian painter.

Biography 
Saveliy Moiseyevich Zeydenberg was born on 28 April 1862 in Berdychiv, in the Kiev Governorate of the Russian Empire (present-day Ukraine). He studied painting at the Saint Petersburg Academy of Arts, graduating in 1891, by presenting the paintings "Joseph Sold by His Brothers" and "Moses Receiving the Tablets".

Zeydenberg was active in the artistic circle founded in Saint Petersburg by Arkhip Ivanovich Kuindzhi. He was awarded distinctions at various exhibition in Russia, among which a gold medal in 1890 for the painting "Saint Peter Healing a Lame Man". In the following years, he presented several paintings depicting the live of the Jewish population in Russian provincial towns.

In 1891 Zeydenberg was appointed professor of art history at the Saint Petersburg Academy of Arts.

Bibliography 
  Энциклопедия благотворительности Санкт-Петербурга - Общество Имени А. И. Куинджи
  Зейденберг (Зайденберг) Савелий Моисеевич
  Большая биографическая энциклопедия Зейденберг, С. М.

1862 births
1942 deaths
People from Berdychiv
People from Kiev Governorate
Ukrainian Jews
19th-century painters from the Russian Empire
Russian male painters
20th-century Russian painters
19th-century male artists from the Russian Empire
20th-century Russian male artists